Cytoplasmic dynein 2 heavy chain 1 is a protein that in humans is encoded by the DYNC2H1 gene.

It is associated with Short rib-polydactyly syndrome type 3.

It is also associated with Asphyxiating thoracic dysplasia.

See also
 dynein

References

Further reading